George Barnett (December 9, 1859April 27, 1930) was the 12th Commandant of the United States Marine Corps. He was a pioneer of amphibious warfare and the U.S. Marine Commandant during American involvement in World War I.

Early life and education
Barnett was born on December 9, 1859, in Lancaster, Wisconsin, and grew up in Boscobel, Wisconsin. He entered the U.S. Naval Academy in June 1877, graduating in 1881 with the first academy class to provide officers to the Marine Corps. After spending two years at sea as a cadet-midshipman aboard , he was transferred to the Marine Corps and was appointed a second lieutenant on 1 July 1883. While serving as a second lieutenant he did duty at the various Marine Barracks in the eastern part of the United States and commanded the Marine contingent at Sitka, Alaska, for three years.

After completing the second of several tours of sea duty he served one year at the Marine Barracks, Navy Yard, Washington, D.C., and was then attached to a U.S. Marine guard at the World's Columbian Exposition at Chicago, where he remained until it closed. At that time he resumed his regular duties at the Washington, D.C. Navy Yard.

Career

Spanish–American War
In June 1896, Barnett again went to sea, this time aboard . While serving on that vessel during the Spanish–American War, he participated in several bombardments of the forts at Santiago, Cuba. In that same year, Barnett became a Veteran Companion of the Pennsylvania Commandery of the Military Order of Foreign Wars.

Commands
Barnett, as a captain, came ashore for duty at Marine Corps Headquarters in Washington, D.C., in May 1901, and was promoted to major shortly afterwards.

Major Barnett returned to Washington in December 1902, only to be placed in command of another battalion of Marines being transferred less than a month later to join the first Brigade of Marines in the Philippine Islands. Arriving in the Philippines a few months later, he was transferred to duty as a Fleet Marine Officer of the Asiatic Fleet and served on several vessels of that fleet until December 1904, when he rejoined the First Brigade of Marines.

Barnett was then transferred from the Philippine Islands to Washington, D.C., in April 1905, and shortly after arriving in the United States received a promotion to lieutenant colonel. He attended the Naval War College in 1906 and served as Commanding Officer, Marine Barracks, Navy Yard in Washington for a period of one year when he was again placed in command of an expeditionary battalion which sailed on board  for Havana, Cuba, where it landed and became part of the Army of Cuban Pacification.

Lt. Colonel Barnett's organization was augmented to a regiment soon after landing in Cuba, while the entire Marine Expeditionary Force was increased to a brigade under the command of Colonel Littleton W.T. Waller. Barnett's regiment was almost immediately transferred to Cianfuegos, where it spread out over a wide area with Barnett controlling a considerable portion of the island. A large army expeditionary force relieved part of the Marines in Cuba and Barnett returned to Washington early in November 1906.

After commanding the U.S. Marine Barracks in Washington for a period of one year, Barnett was transferred to the U.S. Marine Corps Headquarters and was shortly afterwards ordered to command the Marine Detachment, American Legation, Peking, China. Upon completing his tour of duty in the Far East he returned to the United States during the summer of 1910 and assumed command of the Marine Barracks, Philadelphia, Pennsylvania. He was promoted to the rank of colonel on 11 October of that year.

During the next three years he was sent to Cuba, each year in command of the First Regiment of Marines, which was repeatedly sent to that troublesome island on account of serious domestic disturbances, which the United States was obligated to control under provisions of the Platt Amendment. While this serious undertaking was being conducted, the First Advanced Base Brigade of Marines was organized at Philadelphia, under the command of Barnett. He led that organization on extensive maneuvers with the Atlantic Fleet to Puerto Rico from which he returned on 15 February.

Commandant of the Marine Corps
Barnett was appointed Major General Commandant of the Marine Corps on 25 February 1914 for a period of four years. He was the first Commandant to be appointed on a four-year term in accordance with a law passed the previous year. He was promoted to permanent brigadier general on 29 August 1916.

The first important military event of his administration as Commandant was the sending of a reinforced brigade of Marines to take part in the operations which occurred at Vera Cruz, Mexico, during 1914. A minor intervention in Haiti was made during that year and an expeditionary force of Marines was kept afloat for some time along the west coast of Mexico. Serious trouble began to brew in both Haiti and Santo Domingo and within a year it was necessary for the Marine Corps under Commandant Barnett's guidance to place a brigade of Marines in each of these two countries, where they continued on duty until after the close of his administration.

World War I activities of the Marine Corps were carried out under the general direction of Commandant Barnett as well. The Marine Corps expanded to more than three thousand officers and approximately 75,500 enlisted men. In addition to maintaining the occupation of Haiti and the Dominican Republic and reinforcing the regular stations of the Marine Corps, two brigades of Marines were deployed to France, while other Marine units occupied parts of Cuba, and another Marine brigade was held in reserve in Galveston, Texas. Large training centers were also established at Quantico, Virginia, and Parris Island, South Carolina. Barnett also saw the Marine Corps through the difficult period of demobilization and reorganization at the close of the war. For his outstanding service, he was honored by the French Government by being made a commander of the Legion of Honor, and he was awarded the Navy Distinguished Service Medal by the Secretary of the Navy. The citation for the medal reads:

Later life and death
Barnett was relieved as Commandant of the Marine Corps on 30 June 1920, by order of Secretary of the Navy Josephus Daniels and resumed his permanent rank as Brigadier General. On 5 March 1921, he was given the regular rank of Major General. He spent the remaining years of his active service as Commanding General of the Department of the Pacific.

Barnett retired on 9 December 1923, having reached the statutory age limit of sixty-four years. He died on 27 April 1930 in Washington, D.C., and was buried in the Arlington National Cemetery.

Personal life
Barnett is related to the military strategist Thomas P.M. Barnett (first cousin thrice removed). General Barnett's wife, Lelia (Montague) Gordon, was the first cousin of Alice (Montague) Warfield, the mother of Bessie Wallis Warfield, later Wallis, Duchess of Windsor, and sister-in-law to Captain Henry C. Mustin. His stepson, Basil Gordon (father of Basil Gordon), also served in the United States Marine Corps.

Awards
Sampson Medal
Spanish Campaign Medal
Philippine Campaign Medal
Cuban Pacification Medal
Victory Medal

References

Further reading

1859 births
1930 deaths
Burials at Arlington National Cemetery
Military personnel from Wisconsin
People from Boscobel, Wisconsin
People from Lancaster, Wisconsin
United States Marine Corps Commandants
United States Naval Academy alumni
Naval War College alumni
American military personnel of the Banana Wars
American military personnel of the Spanish–American War
American military personnel of the Philippine–American War
Commandeurs of the Légion d'honneur
United States Marine Corps generals
United States Marine Corps personnel of World War I